Nămoloasa is a commune in Galați County, in the Western Moldavia region of Romania. It is composed of three villages: Crângeni, Nămoloasa, and Nămoloasa-Sat.

Nămoloasa lies on the right bank of the river Siret, which separates it from the rest of Galați County; the commune can be accessed only through Vrancea County, where there is a bridge over the Siret.

Nămoloasa is geographically part of the strategic Focșani Gate. Nămoloasa was also part of the 19th century Focșani–Nămoloasa–Galați line built to guard this area more properly.

References

Communes in Galați County
Localities in Western Moldavia